The following is a list of shopping centers in the region of Montreal.

Island of Montreal - City of Montreal

 Ville-Marie, Montreal
 Le 1000 de la Gauchetière
 2020 University
 Carrefour Industrielle Alliance (formerly Simpsons (department store))
 Le Centre Eaton Montreal
 Complexe Desjardins
 Complexe Les Ailes (formerly Eaton's)
 Complexe Guy-Favreau (:fr:Complexe Guy-Favreau; owned by SNC-Lavalin ProFac)
 Les Cours Mont-Royal
 Faubourg Sainte-Catherine
 Place Alexis Nihon (Ville-Marie) (partly in Westmount)
 Place Bonaventure
 Place Dupuis
 Place Montreal Trust
 Place Ville-Marie
 Promenades Cathédrale / Tour KPMG
 Le Swatow Plaza
 Ahuntsic-Cartierville
 Les Galeries Normandie
 Marché Central (Mega Mall)
 Place Fleury
 Anjou
 Centre commercial Joseph-Renaud
 Les Galeries d'Anjou
Les Halles D'Anjou
 Côte-des-Neiges–Notre-Dame-de-Grâce
 Centre commercial Van Horne
 Centre commercial Wilderton
 Plaza Côte-des-Neiges
 Lachine
 Les Galeries Lachine
 LaSalle
 Carrefour Angrignon
 Place LaSalle
 Place Newman
 Mercier–Hochelaga-Maisonneuve
 Centre Champlain  (Village Champlain)   Honoré-Beaugrand (Montreal Metro)#Nearby points of interest
 Centre commercial Domaine
 Place Versailles
 Promenade Ontario
 Montréal-Nord
 Centre Commercial Forest
 Centre Montréal-Nord
 Place Bourassa
 Rosemont–La Petite-Patrie
 Plaza Saint-Hubert
 Centre commercial Maisonneuve
 Rivière-des-Prairies–Pointe-aux-Trembles
 Carrefour de la Pointe
 Faubourg des Prairies
 Place Pointe-aux-Trembles
 Saint-Laurent
 Centre commercial Village Montpellier
 Les Galeries Saint-Laurent
 Norgate Shopping Centre (first shopping mall built in Canada, a strip mall)
 Méga Centre Côte-Vertu
 Place Vertu
 Saint-Leonard
 Le Boulevard Shopping Centre (partly in Villeray–Saint-Michel–Parc-Extension)
 Place Michelet
 Place Provencher
 Place Viau
 Carrefour Langelier
 Verdun
 Le Campanîle & Place du Commerce
 Villeray–Saint-Michel–Parc-Extension
 Centre commercial Le Boulevard (partly in Saint-Leonard)

Island of Montreal - outside the city of Montreal
 Beaconsfield
 Centre commercial Beaconsfield
 Côte Saint-Luc
 Centre commercial Côte-St-Luc
 Cavendish Mall
 Decarie Square Mall
 Dollard-des-Ormeaux
 Les Galeries des Sources
 Marche de l'Ouest
 Dorval
 Les Jardins Dorval
 Kirkland
 Centre Kirkland & Centre St-Charles
 Place Kirkland
 Les Galeries Kirkland </ref>
 Mount Royal
 Centre commercial Place l'Acadie-Beaumont
 Centre commercial VMR
 Centre Rockland–Mount Royal
 Pointe-Claire
 Centre Fairview–Pointe-Claire
 Plaza Pointe-Claire
 Westmount
 Place Alexis-Nihon (partly in Montreal/Ville-Marie)
 Westmount Square

Laval
Laval
 Carrefour Laval
 Centre commercial Duvernay
 Centre commercial Saint-Martin
 Centre commercial Val-des-Brises 
 Centre Laval
 Centropolis
 Galeries Laval
 Galeries du Moulin
 Méga-Centre Val-des-Brises (A-19 & A-440)
 Méga-Centre Sainte-Dorothée (A-13 & Notre-Dame Blvd)
 SmartCentres West
 SmartCentres Centre
 SmartCentres East

Longueuil

 Boucherville
 Carrefour de la Rive Sud
 Promenades Montarvilles
 Brossard
 Mail Champlain
 Place Portobello
 Quartier DIX30
 Greenfield Park (Longueuil)
 5000 Taschereau
 Galeries Taschereau
 Place Greenfield Park
 Longueuil
 Centre Jacques-Cartier
 Place Desormeaux
 Place Longueuil
 Saint-Bruno-de-Montarville
 Promenades Saint-Bruno
Saint-Hubert (Longueuil)
 Carrefour Saint-Hubert
 Centre Cousineau
 Saint-Lambert
 Carré Saint-Lambert

Presqu'Île
 Pincourt
 Le Faubourg de l'Île
 Salaberry-de-Valleyfield
 Centre Valleyfield
 Vaudreuil-Dorion
 Centre d'achats Hudson
 Centre d'achats Vaudreuil

Couronne Nord
 Deux-Montagnes / Sainte-Marthe-sur-le-Lac
 Centre commercial Les Promenades Deux-Montagnes
 Repentigny
 Les Galeries Rive-Nord
 Rosemère
 Centre commercial Les Galeries Mille-Îles
 Place Rosemère
 Boisbriand
 Faubourg Boisbriand
 Saint-Eustache
 Carrefour Saint-Eustache
 Sainte-Thérèse
 Centre commercial Plaza Ste-Thérèse
 Terrebonne
 Les Galeries de Terrebonne

Couronne Sud
 Beloeil
 Mail Montenach
 Châteauguay
 Centre régional Châteauguay
 Varennes
 Galeries Varennes

Public markets
 Marché Atwater (Montreal)
 Marché Bonsecours (Montreal)
 Marché des Jardiniers (La Prairie)
 Marché Jean-Talon (Montreal)
 Marché Lachine (Lachine)
 Marché Maisonneuve (Montreal)
 Marché Public 440 (Laval)
 Marché Saint-Jacques (Montreal)

See also
 List of small shopping centres in Montreal
 Montreal underground city malls
 List of shopping malls in Greater Longueuil
 List of malls in Toronto
 List of shopping malls in Saskatoon
 List of largest shopping malls in Canada
 List of shopping malls in Canada

References

Montreal
Shopping malls
Shopping malls, Montreal
Shopping malls in Montreal